Gejza Pulen (born 19 May 1979 in Rožňava) is a Slovak former football goalkeeper who played most of his career in leading clubs across eastern Slovakia. His first notable career stop was in 2. Liga playing for Slovmag Jelšava.

Career statistics

Last updated: 9 June 2009

References

External links

 Player profile at official club website

1979 births
Living people
People from Rožňava
Slovak footballers
Slovak expatriate footballers
Association football goalkeepers
MFK Rožňava players
1. FC Tatran Prešov players
FK Jablonec players
FC Steel Trans Ličartovce players
FC VSS Košice players
MŠK Rimavská Sobota players
MFK Vranov nad Topľou players
MFK Karviná players
FC Košice (2018) players
Czech First League players
Slovak Super Liga players
2. Liga (Slovakia) players
3. Liga (Slovakia) players
Expatriate footballers in the Czech Republic
Slovak expatriate sportspeople in the Czech Republic